Dowlatabad (also Romanized as Dowlatābād; also known as Daulalābād and Daulatābad) is a village in Nasrovan Rural District, in the Central District of Darab County, Fars Province, Iran. At the 2006 census, its population was 1,069, in 242 families.

References 

Populated places in Darab County